Infernus is the sixth album by the American death metal band Hate Eternal, released on August 21, 2015. It is the second album to feature bassist J.J. Hrubovcak, and the only album to feature drummer Chason Westmoreland from Burning the Masses before his departure due to "family matters" and also their first album to be released by Season of Mist.

Track listing

Personnel
Hate Eternal
 Erik Rutan – guitars, vocals
 JJ Hrubovcak – bass
 Chason Westmoreland – drums

Production
Edward Linsmier – photography
Erik Rutan – recording, mixing, producer, engineering
Eliran Kantor – artwork
J.J. Hrubovcak – additional engineering
Jarrett Pritchard – drum technician
Alan Douches – mastering

References

Hate Eternal albums
2015 albums
Albums produced by Erik Rutan
Season of Mist albums